We Bring the Noise! is the eighth studio album by German hard dance group Scooter, released on 11 June 2001 by Sheffield Tunes in Germany. Two singles were released from the album: "Posse (I Need You on the Floor)" on 21 May 2001, and a remix of "I Shot the DJ" entitled "Aiii Shot the DJ" on 13 August 2001. It is the last studio album featuring Axel Coon, who left the band in 2002 to pursue a solo career in DJing.

Track listing
All songs written by H.P. Baxxter aka Dave, Ice, The Chicks Checker, Rick J. Jordan, Axel Coon, and Jens Thele.
 "Habibi Halua" - 1:08
 "Posse (I Need You on the Floor)" - 3:50
 "Acid Bomb" - 5:32
 "We Bring the Noise!" - 3:44
 "R U Happy?" - 5:19
 "So What'cha Want" - 4:06
 "Burn the House" - 4:34
 "Chinese Whispers" - 6:23
 "I Shot the DJ" - 3:39
 "Transcendental" - 6:01
 "Remedy" – 3:37
 "Devil Drums" – 5:24

Sample credits
"Habibi Halua" samples "Persephone (The Gathering of Flowers)" by Dead Can Dance, taken from the 1987 album Within the Realm of a Dying Sun.
"Posse (I Need You on the Floor)" samples "What Time Is Love?" by The KLF, taken from the 1991 album The White Room. It also uses the lyrics from "Dominator" (1991) by Human Resource.
"R U Happy?" samples "Analog Bubblebath 1" by The Aphex Twin.
"Burn The House" samples "Flesh" by A Split-Second.
"Chinese Whispers" samples "Fountain of Dreams" by Harvey Summers, taken from the 2001 album of the same name.
"Remedy" samples the song "Amphetamine" by Draxx.
Limited Editions of the album contained a cover of the 1978 City song "Am Fenster", which later also appeared on the Push the Beat for this Jam (The Singles 98-02) compilation in a slightly shortened version.

Charts

References 

We Bring The Noise!
We Bring The Noise!